Samer Kamal (born May 12, 1966) is a Jordanian taekwondo practitioner. He competed in the men's featherweight at the 1988 Summer Olympics.

In 1986, Kamal won a silver medal in Seoul 1986 Asian Games. He competed in Seoul again during the 1988 Olympics, winning a bronze medal; equivalent to third place.

Samer has gotten his 9th Dan (rank) Black Belt in the year 2022 from the World Taekwondo Headquarters. The Dan system is a distinguisher of rank-in 2017, he received his 9th Dan from the Chung Do Kwan. In 2022, he received his 9th Dan from the Jidokwan, one of the original nine Korean Martial Arts Schools.

Acclaims 

9th Dan Black belt (Kukkiwon 2022)

9th Dan Black belt (Taekwondo Jidokwan 2022)

9th Dan Black belt (Taekwondo Chung Do Kwan 2017)

1st Class World Taekwondo International Referee since 1999

1st Class Jordanian Instructor since - Amman, Jordan 1987

World Taekwondo Level 1 Coach - February, 2020. Florida, USA

World Taekwondo Level 2 Coach - July, 2020

AI and DC Canada certified Coach - June 2020

Kukkiwon 3rd Class Master - December 2021. Chicago, USA

Kukkiwon 2nd Class Master - July 2022. Washington, USA

Kukkiwon 1st Class Poom and Black Belt Examiner - July 2022. Washington, USA

National Taekwondo Championships 

Jordan's Champion and gold medalist for the years: 82, 83, 84, 86, 87, 88, and 89

Jordan Universities Champion and gold medalist for the years: 83, 84, 85, 86, and 87

Jordan Military Champion and gold medalist for the years: 88 and 89

Participated as a player in the following International Championships

Asian Taekwondo Championships - Singapore 1982

World Taekwondo Championships - Copenhagen (Denmark) 1983

Asian Taekwondo Championships - Manila (Philippines) 1984

Asian Championships - Australia 1986, Bronze

World Cup Championships - Colorado (USA) 1986

Asian Games - Seoul (Korea) 1986, Silver

World University Championships - (USA) 1986, Silver

Belgium International Championships 1987, Silver

Belgium International Championships 1988

Olympic Games - Seoul (Korea) 1988, Silver

Luxembourg International Championships 1988, Gold

Belgium International Championships 1989

World Games - Germany 1989

World Championships - Seoul (Korea) 1989

Taekwondo Training Experience

Chairman at the Champions Martial Arts - Canada since 2011.

Trained at the Taekwondo Academy Center between 1984 and 1985

Trained at the Hamza Taekwondo Center between 1988 and 1989

Trained at the Martial Arts Center between 1984 and 1985

Trained at the Orthodox Club in the years: 90,91,94, and 95

Trainer at the American Community School since 1991 until 2001

Trainer at the International Community School since 1992 until 2001

Head Coach of the Champions Taekwondo Center - Jordan since 1990 until 2001

Taught Taekwondo studies at the Jordan University for the year 1992

International Coaching in Open Championships 

Head Coach for Champions Martial Arts Centers team in Canada Open - Montreal 2020

Head Coach for Champions Martial Arts Centers team in Toronto Open - Toronto 2019

Head Coach for the Jordanian Centers Team for the Belgium International Championships 1992

Head Coach for the Jordanian Centers Team for the Belgium International Championships 1993

Head Coach for the Jordanian Centers Team for the Dome International Championships - Yorkshire (England) 1995, Second Place

Head Coach for the Jordanian Centers Team for the Dome International Championships - Yorkshire (England) 1996, First Place

Head Coach for the Jordanian Centers Team for the Dome International Championships - Yorkshire (England) 1997, First Place

Head Coach for the Jordanian Centers Team for the Dome International Championships - Yorkshire (England) 1998

National Team coaching in international championships 
Coach of the Men National Team for the Asian Championships - Manila (Philippines) 1994, Fifth Place

Coach of the Female Junior National Team for the World Junior Championships - Barcelona (Spain) 1996

Coach of the Taekwondo Female National Team for the Pan Arab Games - Beirut (Lebanon) 1997, Third Place

Coach of the Female Junior National Team for the World Junior Championships - Istanbul (Turkey) 1998

Technical Manager of the Men National Team for the 4th Arab Championships - Cairo (Egypt) 2003, Second Place

Head of Team for the Men & Female National Team for the 16th Asian Championships - Seoul (Korea) 2004, Fifth Place

Taekwondo Refereeing & Arbitration Experience 

1st Class International Referee since 1999

International Referee since 1989

Chairman of the Arab Referee Committee from the year 1997 until 1999

Chairman of the Jordanian Referee Committee for the years 91,92,94,96, and 97

As a lecturer 

Speaker at ACSA International Sports Forum (Virtual - 2021)

Speaker at many Taekwondo Virtual Forums - 2020-2021

Speaker at ISAPA, 2018 PyeongChang Olympics Conference - PyeongChang (Korea) 2017

Lecturer of Rules & Regulations for the International Instructor course - Doha (Qatar) 2003

Lecturer of Rules & Regulations for the Tunisian Referees - (Tunisia) 1998.

Lecturer of Rules & Regulations for the International Instructor course - Sana'a (Yemen) 1998

Chairman of the Arbitration Board of the 1st Bahrain International Taekwondo Championship - Manama (Bahrain) 2007

Referee Director for the 2nd Arab Taekwondo Championships - Rabat (Morocco) 1998

Refereed in the unrecognized Cyprus International Championships - Nicosia (Cyprus) 1996

Referee Chairman of the 9th Pan Arab Games - Amman (Jordan) 1999

Referee Chairman of The Aqsa International Championships - Doha (Qatar) 2001

Seminars & Referee Courses 
Joined the International Referee Refreshing Course - WT online (Korea) 2020

Joined the International Referee Refreshing Course - Zagreb (Croatia) 2018

Joined the 38th Poomsae International Referee Seminar -  Zagreb (Croatia) 2018

Joined the International Referee Refreshing Course - Cairo (Egypt) 2007

Joined the International Referee Refreshing Course - Amman (Jordan) 2002

Joined the International Referee Refreshing Course  - Athens (Greece) 1999

Joined the International Referee Refreshing Course  - Orlando (USA) 1998

Joined the International Referee Refreshing Course  - Manila (Philippines) 1995

Joined the International Referee Refreshing Course  - Olympia (France) 1992

Joined the International Referee Refreshing Course  - Athens (Greece) 1991

Joined the 19th International Referee Seminar - Cairo (Egypt) 1989

Referee and Judge Participations 
Participated in the World Championships - Garmich (Germany) 2003

Participated in the World Championships - Edmonton (Canada) 1999

Participated in the US Open, Los Angeles International recognized Championships - California (USA) 1999

Participated in the 13th Asian Games - Bangkok (Thailand) 1998

Participated in the US Open, Orlando International recognized Championships - Florida (USA) 1998

Participated in the World Championships - New York (USA) 1993

Participated in the Asian Championships - Kuala Lumpur (Malaysia) 1992

Participated in the World Championships - Athens (Greece) 1991

Participated in the World Cup Championships - Barcelona (Spain) 1990

Sports Association Impact 

President of Arab Canadian Sports Association since September 2020

President of Asia Oceania Olympians Association since November 2011.

Member of the Advisory Committee of the Kukkiwon (World Taekwondo Headquarter) since August 2016.

Executive Member of the World Olympian Association from November 2009 until November 2011

Chairman of Business Affairs Committee of the World Olympian Association from February 2010 until November 2011

Vice president and founding member of the Jordan Olympian Association from the year 2004 until now

One of the Founding Board Members and executive board member of the International Jordanian Athletes Cultural Association 1993 until now

Member of the World Taekwondo Federation Games Committee from the year 2005 up until 2008.

Member of the Jordanian Taekwondo Federation from the year 2000 until April 2006.

Secretary General of the Jordan Taekwondo Federation in the year 2004.

Member of the Technical Committee of the Jordanian Olympics Committee from the year 1999 until 2002

Chairman of the Jordanian Taekwondo Technical Committee from the year 2001 until 2002

Member in the Jordanian Taekwondo Technical Committee from the year 2002 until 2003

Member in the Jordanian Taekwondo Promotion Test Committee from the year 1992 until 2003

Member of the Jordanian Korean Friendship Association from 1999 until 2003

Major Awards and Recognition 

Chosen as the best Jordanian Athlete during 1986 and 1988, Kamal's illustrious career has led to recognition such as being given the Independence Badge of Honor (4th Degree) by His late Majesty King Hussein Ben Talal in 1988, acknowledgement as the Best Jordanian Athlete for the century in 1999, and
in 2018 and 2019, being the top ranked Kukkiwon (World Taekwondo Headquarters) Master.

References 

9th Dan Taekwondo Grandmasters
List of taekwondo grandmasters

External links 
 
 

1966 births
Living people
Place of birth missing (living people)
Jordanian male taekwondo practitioners
Olympic taekwondo practitioners of Jordan
Taekwondo practitioners at the 1988 Summer Olympics
Asian Games silver medalists for Jordan
Asian Games medalists in taekwondo
Taekwondo practitioners at the 1986 Asian Games
Medalists at the 1986 Asian Games